Attica USD 511 is a public unified school district headquartered in Attica, Kansas, United States.  The district includes the community of Attica and nearby rural areas.

Schools
The school district operates the following schools:
 Attica Jr/Sr High School
 Puls Elementary

See also
 Kansas State Department of Education
 Kansas State High School Activities Association
 List of high schools in Kansas
 List of unified school districts in Kansas

References

External links
 

School districts in Kansas